The Robert W. Gardner House in Quincy, Illinois, Adams County, is designed in the Second Empire style (along with a few elements common to Italianate style) and found its place among the locales on the National Register of Historic Places on April 20, 1979. Though the building was constructed in the later half of the 19th century, 1873, the architect as well as the builder are unknown. The interior woodwork, all original, has been fully restored including the walnut staircase. Gardner invented the speed governor used in steam engines and the Gardner Museum of Architecture and Design in Quincy is named for him.

Notes

External links
Gardner Museum of Architecture and Design
National Register nomination

Houses in Adams County, Illinois
Houses completed in 1873
Houses on the National Register of Historic Places in Illinois
National Register of Historic Places in Adams County, Illinois
Buildings and structures in Quincy, Illinois